The 2016 Arizona United SC season is the club's third season of United Soccer League play.

Friendlies 
All times from this point are on Mountain Standard Time (UTC−07:00)

USL 

All times from this point on Mountain Standard Time (UTC−07:00)

Results summary

League results

Western Conference standings

U.S. Open Cup

Statistics

Goalkeepers

Transfers

Loan in

Loan out

See also 
 2016 in American soccer
 2016 USL season
 Arizona United SC

References 

2
Arizona United SC
Arizona United SC
Arizona United SC
Arizona United SC